An annular solar eclipse took place on February 26, 2017. A solar eclipse occurs when the Moon passes between Earth and the Sun, thereby totally or partly obscuring the image of the Sun for a viewer on Earth. An annular solar eclipse occurs when the Moon's apparent diameter is smaller than the Sun's, blocking most of the Sun's light and causing the Sun to look like an annulus (ring). An annular eclipse appears as a partial eclipse over a region of the Earth thousands of kilometres wide. Occurring only 4.7 days before perigee (Perigee on March 3, 2017), the Moon's apparent diameter was larger. The moon's apparent diameter was just over 0.7% smaller than the Sun's.

It was visible across southern South America in the morning and ended in south-western Africa at sunset. In Argentina, the best places to see the eclipse were located in the south of the Chubut Province, in the towns of Facundo, Sarmiento and Camarones. Lunar Perigee occurred at about 2017 Mar 03 at 07:41:24.5 UTC, 4.7 days later.

Predictions and additional information

Eclipse characteristics 

Eclipse Magnitude: 0.99223

Eclipse Obscuration: 0.98451

Gamma: -0.45780

Saros Series: 140th (29 of 71)

Conjunction times 

Greatest Eclipse: 26 Feb 2017 14:53:24.5 UTC (14:54:32.8 TD)

Ecliptic Conjunction: 26 Feb 2017 14:58:23.4 UTC (14:59:31.7 TD)

Equatorial Conjunction: 26 Feb 2017 14:38:46.0 UTC (14:39:54.4 TD)

Geocentric coordinates of sun and moon 

Sun right ascension: 22.66

Sun declination: -8.5

Sun diameter: 1938.0 arcseconds

Moon right ascension: 22.66

Moon declination: -8.9

Moon diameter: 1895.6 arcseconds

Geocentric libration of moon 

Latitude: 5.1 degrees south

Longitude: 0.6 degrees east

Direction: 336.5 (NNW)

Images

Gallery

Related eclipses

Eclipses of 2017 
 A penumbral lunar eclipse on February 11.
 An annular solar eclipse on February 26.
 A partial lunar eclipse on August 7.
 A total solar eclipse on August 21.

Solar eclipses descending node 2015-2018 

 Saros 120: Total Solar Eclipse March 20, 2015
 Saros 130: Total Solar Eclipse March 8–9, 2016
 Saros 140: Annular Solar Eclipse February 26, 2017
 Saros 150: Partial Solar Eclipse February 15, 2018

Tzolkinex 
Preceded: Solar eclipse of January 15, 2010

Followed: Solar eclipse of April 8, 2024

Half-Saros cycle 
Preceded: Lunar eclipse of February 21, 2008

Followed: Lunar eclipse of March 3, 2026

Tritos 
Preceded: Solar eclipse of March 29, 2006

Followed: Solar eclipse of January 26, 2028

Solar Saros 140 
Preceded: Solar eclipse of February 16, 1999

Followed: Solar eclipse of March 9, 2035

Inex 
Preceded: Solar eclipse of March 18, 1988

Followed: Solar eclipse of February 5, 2046

Triad 
Preceded: Solar eclipse of April 28, 1930

Followed: Solar eclipse of December 29, 2103

Solar eclipses 2015–2018

Saros 140 

It is a part of Saros cycle 140, repeating every 18 years, 11 days, containing 71 events. The series started with partial solar eclipse on April 16, 1512. It contains total eclipses from July 21, 1656 through November 9, 1836, hybrid eclipses from November 20, 1854 through December 23, 1908, and annular eclipses from January 3, 1927 through December 7, 2485. The series ends at member 71 as a partial eclipse on June 1, 2774. The longest duration of totality was 4 minutes, 10 seconds on August 12, 1692.

Inex series

Metonic cycle

Notes and references

References
 www.solar-eclipse.de - The annular solar eclipse of 02/26/2017
 NASA graphics
 Interactive map of the eclipse from NASA
 NASA Besselian Elements - Annular Solar Eclipse of 2017 February 26
 hermet.org: Annular Solar Eclipse: February 26 2017

External links

 www.solar-eclipse.de - Average cloud coverage and cities along the eclipse path

2017 2 26
2017 in science
2017 02 26
February 2017 events
2017 in South America
2017 in Africa